The 1983 Ice Hockey World Championships took place in West Germany from 16 April to 2 May. The games were played in Munich, Dortmund and Düsseldorf. Eight teams took part, with each playing each other once. The four best teams then play each other once more with no results carrying over this time, and the other four teams played each other again to determine ranking and relegation. This was the 49th World Championships, and also the 60th European Championships. The Soviet Union became world champions for the 19th time, tying Canada, and won their 22nd European title.

Promotion and relegation was effective for 1985 as the IIHF did not run a championship in Olympic years at this time.  Nations that did not participate in the Sarajevo Olympics were invited to compete in the Thayer Tutt Trophy.

World Championship Group A (West Germany)

First round

Final Round

Consolation Round

Italy was relegated to Group B.

World Championship Group B (Japan)
Played in Tokyo 21–31 March.

The United States was promoted to Group A, and both Romania and Yugoslavia were relegated to Group C.  Additionally, the USA, Poland and Austria earned berths in the Olympics. Fourth place Norway had to play off against the Group C winner (the Netherlands) to fill the final Olympic spot.

World Championship Group C (Hungary)
Played in Budapest 11–20 March.  The champion earned the right to playoff against Group B fourth place for a berth in the Olympics.

The Netherlands and Hungary were both promoted to Group B,

Ranking and statistics

Tournament Awards
Best players selected by the directorate:
Best Goaltender:       Vladislav Tretiak
Best Defenceman:       Alexei Kasatonov
Best Forward:          Jiří Lála
Media All-Star Team:
Goaltender:  Vladislav Tretiak
Defence:  Viacheslav Fetisov,  Alexei Kasatonov
Forwards:  Vladimir Krutov,  Igor Larionov,  Sergei Makarov

Final standings
The final standings of the tournament according to IIHF:

European championships final standings
The final standings of the European championships according to IIHF:

Scoring leaders
List shows the top skaters sorted by points, then goals.

Citations

References

Complete results

IIHF Men's World Ice Hockey Championships
World Championships
I
1983
Ice Hockey World Championships
Ice Hockey World Championships
Sports competitions in Munich
Sports competitions in Dortmund
Sports competitions in Düsseldorf
Ice Hockey World Championships
Ice Hockey World Championships, 1983
Ice Hockey World Championships
Ice Hockey World Championships
Sports competitions in Tokyo
Ice Hockey World Championships
International sports competitions in Budapest
Ice Hockey World Championships, 1983
International ice hockey competitions hosted by Japan
International ice hockey competitions hosted by Hungary
World Championships,
World Championships,
Ice Hockey World Championships, 1983